Jamboni (also spelled Jambani) is a village and a gram panchayat in the Jamboni CD block in the Jhargram subdivision of the Jhargram district in the state of West Bengal, India.

Geography

Location

Area overview
Jhargram subdivision, the only one in Jhargram district, shown in the map alongside, is composed of  hills, mounds and rolling lands. It is rather succinctly described in the District Human Development Report, 2011 (at that time it was part of Paschim Medinipur district), “The western boundary is more broken and picturesque, for the lower ranges of the Chhotanagpur Hills line the horizon, the jungle assumes the character of forest, and large trees begin to predominate. The soil, however, is lateritic, a considerable area is unproductive, almost uninhabited, especially in the extreme north-west where there are several hills over 1000 feet in height. The remainder of the country is an almost level plain broken only by the sand hills.”3.48% of the population lives in urban areas and 96.52% lives in the rural areas. 20.11% of the total population belonged to scheduled castes and 29.37% belonged to scheduled tribes.

Note: The map alongside presents some of the notable locations in the subdivision. All places marked in the map are linked in the larger full screen map.

Demographics
According to the 2011 Census of India, Jamboni had a total population of 886 of which 437 (49%) were males and 449 (51%) were females. Population in the age range 0-6 years was 33. The total number of literate persons in Jamboni was 603 (68.06% of the population over 6 years).

Civic administration

Police station
Jamboni police station has jurisdiction over Jamboni  CD block.

Transport
Jamboni stands at the crossing of Chilkigarh-Jamboni, Jhargram-Jamboni and Balidiha-Jamboni Roads.

References

Villages in Jhargram district